Baerietta is a genus of tapeworms of frogs in Japan.

Species 
 Baerietta japonica

References 

Cestoda genera
Parasites of amphibians